New Stuyahok is a city in Dillingham Census Area, Alaska, United States. At the 2010 census the population was 510, up from 471 in 2000.

Geography
New Stuyahok is located at  (59.451850, -157.312106), along the Nushagak River.

Demographics

New Stuyahok first appeared on the 1950 U.S. Census as an unincorporated village. It formally incorporated in 1972.

As of the census of 2000, there were 471 people, 105 households, and 91 families residing in the city.  The population density was 14.4 people per square mile (5.6/km2).  There were 107 housing units at an average density of 3.3 per square mile (1.3/km2).  The racial makeup of the city was 3.82% White, 92.78% Native American, and 3.40% from two or more races.  1.27% of the population were Hispanic or Latino of any race. There were 105 households, out of which 57.1% had children under the age of 18 living with them, 56.2% were married couples living together, 21.0% had a female householder with no husband present, and 13.3% were non-families. 11.4% of all households were made up of individuals, and 1.9% had someone living alone who was 65 years of age or older.  The average household size was 4.49 and the average family size was 4.87.

In the city, the age distribution of the population shows 40.8% under the age of 18, 10.4% from 18 to 24, 27.8% from 25 to 44, 16.6% from 45 to 64, and 4.5% who were 65 years of age or older.  The median age was 24 years. For every 100 females, there were 122.2 males.  For every 100 females age 18 and over, there were 108.2 males.

The median income for a household in the city was $26,042, and the median income for a family was $26,458. Males had a median income of $31,250 versus $41,250 for females. The per capita income for the city was $7,931.  About 32.6% of families and 31.7% of the population were below the poverty line, including 43.5% of those under age 18 and 15.4% of those age 65 or over.

Education
The "Chief" Ivan Blunka School of the Southwest Region School District serves the village.

References

Cities in Alaska
Cities in Dillingham Census Area, Alaska